Corbitant was a Wampanoag Indian sachem or sagamore under Massasoit. Corbitant was sachem of the Pocasset tribe in present-day North Tiverton, Rhode Island, c. 1618–1630. He lived in Mattapuyst or Mattapoiset, located in the southern part of today's Swansea, MA.

In the summer of 1621, he was involved in a minor altercation with the Plymouth colony involving the Patuxet refugee Tisquantum ("Squanto")  at present-day Middleborough, Massachusetts. Corbitant had menaced both Tisquantum and his companion Hobomok for their close ties with the white strangers. Fearing for their lives, Hobomok was able to get away and escaped back to Plymouth, where he rallied the pilgrims under Miles Standish. Standish led ten men of Plymouth in arms to rescue Tisquantum from Corbitant. They attacked the Wampanoag village at Nemasket, but by that time Corbitant had released Squanto and withdrawn from the area. Corbitant was nominally obedient to the Great Sachem Massasoit of the Pokanoket. Although described as a "determined foe of the English," nonetheless, "with other hostile chiefs he signed a treaty of peace with the English in 1621."

Tribes of the Wampanoag federation possessed hunting grounds at Cape Cod, Plymouth, Taunton, Attleboro, Middleboro, Hanson, Duxbury, Freetown, Somerset, Swansea, Mattapoisett, Wareham, and Fall River, in Massachusetts, as well as Tiverton, Aquidneck Island (Newport), Canonicut Island (Jamestown), Little Compton, Bristol, Warren and the lands west to the Providence River. About the year 1622 the Narragansett Federation under Canonicus seized the island of present-day Jamestown from Massasoit.

References 

Native American leaders
17th-century Native Americans
Wampanoag people
People of colonial Massachusetts
Native American history of Massachusetts
Native American people from Massachusetts